Fiona Gaunt (née Fiona Elizabeth Keet-Gaunt; born 25 May 1947) is an English actress and the mother of actress Genevieve Gaunt.

Personal life
According to a 1972 newspaper profile, Gaunt was born in Beirut to Scottish Presbyterian parents and lived in Uganda until she was 16. In 1985 she met the Dutch actor Frederik de Groot. Their daughter, Genevieve, was born in January 1991.

Career
Fiona Gaunt trained at the London Academy of Music and Dramatic Art, graduating in 1969. She subsequently played opposite Anthony Hopkins - as Hélène Kuragina, wife of Pierre Bezukhov - in the BBC's 1972 production of War and Peace. She then starred as psychiatrist Helen Smith in the 1973 science fiction series Moonbase 3. To prepare for her role, Gaunt studied tapes of the Apollo missions.

Gaunt appeared in a 1973 episode of the comedy series Sykes, playing an upper-class girl who tricks Eric Sykes' character into getting engaged. She had a handful of roles in The Two Ronnies, including a stowaway in their spoof of The Onedin Line, and starred as Grace Lovell in the 1978 TV adaptation of A Horseman Riding By. She was also in the first production of Tom Stoppard's 1979 play, Undiscovered Country.

Filmography

Selected stage credits
 The Wizard of Oz - Yvonne Arnaud Theatre, Guildford: 1969-70
 Murder in the Cathedral - Canterbury Cathedral: 1970
 Undiscovered Country - Oliver Theatre, London: 1979
 The Bedbug - Gate Theatre, London: 1980

References

Citations

Sources

External links

1951 births
English television actresses
Living people
Actresses from London
British emigrants to the Netherlands